Brzezinka (sometimes also Brzezinki ) is the part of Warszawice village, Gmina Sobienie-Jeziory. The population is near 40. From 1975 to 1998 this place was in Siedlce Voivodeship.

Villages in Otwock County